Conrad Glenn House (November 1956 – January 2001), was a multimedia artist of Navajo and Oneida ancestry. House's work was significant in redefining Indian art, utilizing many art mediums to preserve symbols and images of his culture and world cultures. His works are in the collection of the Smithsonian's National Museum of the American Indian, Portland Art Museum, Wheelwright Museum, Heard Museum, Navajo Nation Museum and numerous museums and galleries around the world.

Conrad House Award 
In 2002, the Heard Museum Guild created the "Conrad House Award for the Most Innovative Artist". Winners of the Conrad House Award include Marilou Schultz, Travis Emerson, D. Y. Begay, Polly Rose Folwell, Barbara Teller Ornelas, Marvin Oliver, Pat Pruitt, Jason Garcia, Warren Coriz, Melissa S. Cody, Orlando Dugi, Ryan Lee Smith, Susan L. Folwell, Berdine Begay, Shan Goshorn, ShoSho Esquiro, and Marlowe Katoney.

References 
Balancing Factors

Footnotes

Sources 
 Ware, Robert (2006). A Life in Balance: The Art of Conrad House. Jonson Gallery of the University of New Mexico Art Museum. .

1956 births
2001 deaths
20th-century American artists
20th-century Native Americans
Oneida people
Navajo artists